"Herzliebster Jesu" (often translated into English as "Ah, Holy Jesus", sometimes as "O Dearest Jesus") is a Lutheran Passion hymn in German, written in 1630 by Johann Heermann, in 15 stanzas of 4 lines, first published in Devoti Musica Cordis in Breslau. As the original headline reveals, it is based on Augustine of Hippo; this means the seventh chapter of the so-called "Meditationes Divi Augustini", presently ascribed to John of Fécamp.

Melody and musical settings 
The tune, Zahn No. 983, was written ten years later by Johann Crüger and first appeared in Crüger's Neues vollkömmliches Gesangbuch Augsburgischer Confession.

The tune has been used many times, including settings by J.S. Bach: one of the Neumeister Chorales for organ, BWV 1093, two movements of the St John Passion, and three of the St Matthew Passion. Johannes Brahms used it for one of his Eleven Chorale Preludes for organ, Op. 122: No. 2.). Max Reger's Passion, No. 4 from his organ pieces Sieben Stücke, Op. 145 (1915–1916), uses this melody.  Mauricio Kagel quoted the hymn, paraphrased as "Herzliebster Johann, was hast du verbrochen", in his oratorio Sankt-Bach-Passion telling Bach's life, composed for the tricentenary of Bach's birth in 1985.

Christian Fürchtegott Gellert wrote his Passion hymn "" (Lord, strengthen me to reflect on your suffering) to the same melody, and first published in 1757.

Translations
The most common English translation of this hymn was written by Robert Bridges in 1897 and begins with the first line "Ah, holy Jesus, how hast thou offended?" However, several Lutheran hymnals use a translation written in 1863 by Catherine Winkworth which begins "O dearest Jesus, what law hast thou broken?"  An alternative translation in modern English from the Choral Niagara website is also shown below for comparison.

References

17th-century hymns in German
Lutheran hymns
Hymn tunes
1630 works
Passion hymns